In organic chemistry, an aminal or aminoacetal is a functional group or type of organic compound that has two amine groups attached to the same carbon atom: . (As is customary in organic chemistry, R can represent hydrogen or an alkyl group).  A common aminal is bis(dimethylamino)methane, a colorless liquid that is prepared by the reaction of dimethylamine and formaldehyde:
 2 (CH3)2NH  +  CH2O -> [(CH3)2N]2CH2  +  H2O

Aminals are encountered in, for instance, the Fischer indole synthesis.  Several examples exist in nature.

Hexahydro-1,3,5-triazine, an intermediate in the condensation of formaldehyde and ammonia, tends to degrade to hexamethylene tetraamine.

Cyclic aminals can be obtained by the condensation of a diamine and an aldehyde.  Imidazolidines are one class of these cyclic aminals.

See also
Acetal
Hemiaminal

References

Functional groups